Boshoff is a surname. Notable people with the surname include:

Carel Boshoff (1927–2011), South African professor of theology and Afrikaner cultural activist
Cristina Boshoff (born 1980), South African folk pop singer and pianist
Gert Boshoff (1931- 2014), South African Army general.
Henri Boshoff (born 1989), South African rugby union player
Jacobus Nicolaas Boshoff (1808–1881), South African politician
Jannie Boshoff (born 1986), South African rugby union footballer
Linky Boshoff (born 1956), South African tennis player
Marnitz Boshoff (born 1989), South African rugby union player 
Willem Boshoff, South African rugby league player
Willem Boshoff, Artist

Afrikaans-language surnames